Donghai Airlines is an airline headquartered in Shenzhen, Guangdong, with its base at Shenzhen Bao'an International Airport.

History
The company was started in November 2002 as Jetwin Cargo Airline, with 2005 being the originally anticipated launch date for flight operations, using Boeing 737 aircraft. Initially, it was owned by Orient Holdings Group (65% ownership) and (Hong Kong company) East Pacific Holdings (35% ownership).

By 2006, the airline still had not become operational, and its name changed to East Pacific Airlines. By then, the company's ownership was as follows: Shenzhen Donggang Trade (51%), Donghai United Group (25%) and Yonggang (24%), and it expected to begin service in August 2006, subject to gaining approval from Chinese aviation authorities. Delivery of its first freighter aircraft, three Boeing 737-300 converted passenger planes, occurred in September 2006.

In 2010, Donghai Jet Co. Ltd. ordered five Challenger jets from Bombardier Aerospace for business jet service. Its received its first Canadair CL-600 business jet on 13 November 2010.

In 2015, the airline announced plans for a major increase in its operations, including the beginning of international and long-haul flights between 2020 and 2023 and to have 120 aircraft by 2025, including Boeing 787 Dreamliners and additional Boeing 737-800 and Boeing 737 MAX aircraft.

Destinations

Fleet

Current fleet
, Donghai Airlines operates an all-Boeing fleet including the following aircraft:

Former fleet
The airline previously operated 8 737-300F between September 2006 and August 2016

References

External links

  Official website 
 Global website in English 

Cargo airlines of China
Airlines of China
Airlines established in 2002
Companies based in Shenzhen
Chinese companies established in 2002